Chinnici is an Italian surname. Notable people with this surname include:
Caterina Chinnici (born 1954), Italian magistrate and politician
Ileana Chinnici, Italian historian of astronomy
Joseph W. Chinnici (1919–2007), American politician
Rocco Chinnici (1925–1983), Italian magistrate

Italian-language surnames